Alessandra Nobre Resende (born March 5, 1975) is a Brazilian javelin thrower. She is a two-time Ibero-American and a four-time South American champion for her category. Resende, however, narrowly missed out of the medal podium, when she placed fifth in the final at the 2007 Pan American Games in Rio de Janeiro, with a best throw of 57.95 metres.

At age thirty-three, Resende made her Olympic debut at the 2008 Summer Olympics in Beijing, where she competed in the women's javelin throw. She threw the javelin into the field at 56.53 metres, finishing twenty-seventh overall in the qualifying rounds.

Competition record

References

External links

Profile – UOL Esporte 
NBC Olympics Profile

Brazilian female javelin throwers
Living people
Olympic athletes of Brazil
Athletes (track and field) at the 2007 Pan American Games
Athletes (track and field) at the 2008 Summer Olympics
Athletes from São Paulo
1975 births
Pan American Games athletes for Brazil
21st-century Brazilian women